The Crémerie-Restaurant Polidor is a historic restaurant in the 6th arrondissement of Paris. Its predecessor was founded in 1845, and it has had its present name since the beginning of the 20th century. The interior of the restaurant is basically unchanged for over 100 years, and the style of cooking remains that of the late 19th century. The Polidor is located at 41, rue Monsieur-le-Prince in the Odéon area, near the Jardin du Luxembourg. Its name derives from the cream desserts it served in former decades. Most diners sit at long, shared tables, with communal saltcellars and pots of mustard.  Its bathroom, unchanged for decades, has been described as "legendary."

In addition to its decor and cuisine, the Polidor is best known for its illustrious clientele. It is said to have been a favourite of André Gide's, as well as hosting James Joyce, Ernest Hemingway, Antonin Artaud, Paul Valéry, Boris Vian, Julio Cortázar, Jack Kerouac, and Henry Miller. It is also known for being the meeting place of the Collège de ’Pataphysique, and its principals, French writers Luc Étienne and Raymond Queneau.

The Polidor remains a popular restaurant on the Left Bank, particularly among students at the nearby University of Paris (Sorbonne) and Collège de France.

In 2011, it featured in the film Midnight in Paris by Woody Allen. In 2017, it was the setting for the music video for "Desencuentro", a song by Puerto Rican singer Residente. The video features Charlotte Le Bon and Édgar Ramírez.

In the Lee Child novel The Enemy, the protagonist Jack Reacher has dinner with his brother Joe and their French mother Josephine at Polidor.

References

External links 
   Official web site

Restaurants in Paris
Buildings and structures in the 6th arrondissement of Paris